Best Western International, Inc. owns the Best Western Hotels & Resorts brand, which it licenses to over 4,700 hotels worldwide. The franchise, with its corporate headquarters in Phoenix, Arizona, includes more than 2,000 hotels in North America. The brand was founded by M. K. Guertin in 1946. As of December 2021, Larry Cuculic is the president and CEO of Best Western.

In 1964, Canadian hotel owners joined the system. Best Western then expanded to Mexico, Australia, and New Zealand in 1976.

In 2002, Best Western International launched Best Western Premier in Europe and Asia. (The other hotels in the chain were known as Best Western.) In 2011, the chain's branding system-wide changed to a three-tiered system: Best Western, Best Western Plus, and Best Western Premier.

History

Best Western began in the years following World War II. At the time, most hotels were either large urban properties or smaller family-owned roadside hotels. In California, a network of independent hotel operators began making referrals of each other to travelers. This "referral system" consisted of phone calls between one desk operator and another. This small and informal network eventually grew into the modern Best Western hotel brand founded by M.K. Guertin in 1946.

The name "Best Western" originated from the fact that most of the chain's original operators were west of the Mississippi River in the United States. By 1962, Best Western had the only hospitality reservations service covering the entire United States, and in 1963, was the largest motel brand in the industry with 699 member properties and 35,201 rooms. From 1946 to 1964, Best Western had a marketing partnership with Quality Courts, the forerunner of the chain known today as Quality Inns, whose properties were located mostly east of the Mississippi River, and thus not in direct competition with Best Western. This partnership made sense geographically, but was not successful in the long run, and was eventually abandoned. In 1964, Best Western launched an expansion effort of its own operations east of the Mississippi under the name "Best Eastern" for those properties with the same typeset and Gold Crown logo as "Best Western." By 1967, the "Best Eastern" name was dropped and all motels from coast-to-coast got the "Best Western" name and Gold Crown, a move that would further enhance an already successful marketing brand into the "World's Largest Hotel Chain" by the 1970s.  In the late 1980's, comedian Yakoff Smirnoff got to be in a few television advertisements promoting Best Western. 

Best Western's "Gold Crown" logo was introduced in 1964 and would continue with a few minor revisions over the next 32 years, until it was replaced by a blue and yellow logo in 1996. In 2015, Best Western introduced a new family of logos, replacing the core logo and adding signage for Best Western Plus and Best Western Premier.

Best Western purchased WorldHotels in February 2019 adding approximately 360 additional hotels and 81,248 more rooms to its brand. BWH Hotel Group was formed as the parent company of Best Western and WorldHotels following this acquisition.

Legal dispute
Best Western used to call itself a cooperative membership association and, as such, could be seen as a co-op. Around 1985, it abandoned the "cooperative" terminology after courts insisted on calling it a franchisor despite its nonprofit status. The most dramatic example of this was Quist v. Best Western Int'l, Inc., 354 N.W.2d 656 (N.D. 1984), in which the North Dakota Supreme Court decided that Best Western was a franchisor and had to comply with the appropriate laws and regulations.

Best Western GB
Best Western GB began in 1978 when Interchange Hotels of the United Kingdom consisting of independent hoteliers from key locations in the UK elected to trade under the brand name Best Western United Kingdom, effectively an affiliate of Best Western International in the US. Now there are over 260 Best Western hotels within Great Britain.

Best Western Australia and New Zealand
In 1981, Homestead Motor Inns of Australia affiliated with Best Western. This move put 'International' after the Best Western name. The company has since been known as Best Western International.

In early 2007, Best Western Australia took over the rights to operate Best Western properties in New Zealand from the previous company, the Motel Federation of New Zealand. This was a bold but beneficial move for the brand as it made way for better quality properties to be brought into the brand. Currently, Best Western Australia has 205 properties in the group (11 in New Zealand and 194 in Australia).

Best Western Myanmar (Burma)
On May 21, 2013, Best Western International announced that it will take over management of the Green Hill Hotel in Yangon, Myanmar. The acquisition gave the Best Western brand a place presence in Myanmar (Burma) as its first hotel establishment in the country.

Logo history 
As of September 2020, Best Western Hotels and Resorts has 18 brands and logos. Since 1948 the Best Western logo has had approximately 13 modification to the main brand logo, with the last brand logo change made in 2015. In 2010 Best Western divided the brand into 3 descriptors. 

The logo stayed the same, but the descriptors of Plus and Premier were added, and all hotels were either a Best Western, Best Western Plus, or Best Western Premier. In 2015, a complete overhaul of the Best Western logo resulted in a very different logo from the previous years, with the most notable change being the removal of the crown which had been a part of the logo since 1962. 

Since 2014 the brand has created 11 additional brands, for a total of 14 brands with distinctive logos. The Best Western website has a picture of all of their past logos in their "timeline and story" section. Best Western also owns (acquired in February 2019) the WorldHotels Collection which includes 4 additional brands, whose logos are all the same, except for the addition of the distinguishing descriptors of Luxury, Elite, Distinctive, and Crafted.

Brands
The following 18 brands of Best Western are:

Luxury
 WorldHotels Luxury
 WorldHotels Elite
 WorldHotels Distinctive
 WorldHotels Crafted

Upscale
 BW Signature Collection
 BW Premier Collection
 Best Western Premier
 Best Western Plus
 Best Western Hotel & Resort
 Glo
 Vīb
 Sadie by Best Western
 Aiden by Best Western
 Executive Residency by Best Western
 Home by BWH

Economy
 Surestay Signature Collection
 Surestay Plus
 Surestay Studio
 Surestay Hotel

Ownership 
As of 2018, it was nonprofit owned by its franchisee members.

See also

 List of hotels
 List of motels

References

External links

 

 
Motels
Cooperatives in the United States
Hospitality companies
Hospitality companies of the United States
Companies based in Phoenix, Arizona
American companies established in 1946
Hotels established in 1946
1946 establishments in California
Hospitality companies of Hong Kong